The Ford Insomnia Response to Stress Test is a diagnostic tool used to identify individuals predisposed to insomnia. 

It is a nine-item self-report instrument that tests the likelihood that an individual will get sleep disturbances following various stressful events.

References

Sleep